Henry Marvin Bailey (April 24, 1893 – November 1, 1972) was an American sport shooter who competed in the 1924 Summer Olympics, winning the gold medal in the 25 m rapid fire pistol event. He was born in Colleton County, South Carolina and died in Walterboro, South Carolina.

References

External links
profile

1893 births
1972 deaths
American male sport shooters
United States Distinguished Marksman
ISSF pistol shooters
Shooters at the 1924 Summer Olympics
Olympic gold medalists for the United States in shooting
Olympic medalists in shooting
Medalists at the 1924 Summer Olympics
People from Walterboro, South Carolina